KDE Plasma 5 is the fifth and current generation of the graphical workspaces environment created by KDE primarily for Linux systems. KDE Plasma 5 is the successor of KDE Plasma 4 and was first released on 15 July 2014.

It includes a new default theme, known as "Breeze", as well as increased convergence across different devices. The graphical interface was fully migrated to QML, which uses OpenGL for hardware acceleration, which resulted in better performance and reduced power consumption.

Plasma Mobile is a Plasma 5 variant for Linux-based smartphones.

Overview

Software architecture 
KDE Plasma 5 is built using Qt 5 and KDE Frameworks 5, predominantly plasma-framework.

It improves support for HiDPI displays and ships a convergable graphical shell, which can adjust itself according to the device in use. 5.0 also includes a new default theme, dubbed Breeze. Qt 5's QtQuick 2 uses a hardware-accelerated OpenGL(ES) scene graph (canvas) to compose and render graphics on the screen, which allows for the offloading of computationally expensive graphics rendering tasks onto the GPU, freeing up resources on the system's main CPU.

Windowing systems 

KDE Plasma 5 uses the X Window System and Wayland. Support for Wayland was prepared in the compositor and planned for a later release. It was made initially available in the 5.4 release. Stable support for a basic Wayland session was provided in the 5.5 release (December 2015).

Support for NVIDIA proprietary driver for Plasma on Wayland was added in the 5.16 release (June 2019).

Development 
Since the split of the KDE Software Compilation into KDE Plasma, KDE Frameworks and KDE Applications, each subproject can develop at its own pace. KDE Plasma 5 is on its own release schedule, with feature releases every four months, and bugfix releases in the intervening months.

Workspaces 
The latest Plasma 5 features the following workspaces:

 Plasma Desktop for any mouse or keyboard driven computing devices like desktops or laptops
 Plasma Mobile for smartphones
 Plasma Bigscreen for TVs and set-top boxes incl. voice interaction
 Plasma Nano, a minimal shell for embedded and touch-enabled devices, like IoT or automotive

Desktop features 

 KRunner, a search feature with many available plugins. In addition to launching apps, it can find files and folders, open websites, convert from one currency or unit to another, calculate simple mathematical expressions, and perform numerous other useful tasks.
 Flexible desktop and panel layouts composed of individual Widgets (also known as "Plasmoids") which can be individually configured, moved around, replaced with alternatives, or deleted. Each screen's layout can be individually configured. New widgets created by others can be downloaded within Plasma.
 Powerful clipboard with a memory of previously-copied pieces of text that can be called up at will.
 Systemwide notification system supporting quick reply and drag-and-drop straight from notifications, history view, and a Do Not Disturb mode.
 Central location to control playback of media in open apps, the phone (with KDE Connect installed), or the web browser (with Plasma Browser Integration installed)
 Activities, which allow users to separate methods of using the system into distinct workspaces. Each activity can have its own set of favorite and recently used applications, wallpapers, "virtual desktops", panels, window styles, and layout configurations.
 Encrypted vaults for storing sensitive data.
 Night Color, which can automatically warm the screen colors at night, or user-specified times, or manually.
 Styling for icons, cursors, application colors, user interface elements, splash screens and more can be changed, with new styles created by others being downloadable from within the System Settings application. Global Themes allow the entire look-and-feel of the system to be changed in one click.
 Session Management allows apps which were running when the system shut down to be automatically restarted in the same state they were in before.

History 
The first Technology Preview of Plasma 5 (at that time called Plasma 2) was released on 13 December 2013. On 15 July 2014, the first release version Plasma 5.0 was released.
In spring 2015, Plasma 5 replaced Plasma 4 in many popular distributions, such as Fedora 22, Kubuntu 15.04, and openSUSE Tumbleweed.

Releases 

Feature releases are released every four months (up to 5.8 every three months) and bugfix releases in the intervening months. Following version 5.8 LTS KDE plans to support each new LTS version for 18 months with bug fixes, while new regular releases will see feature improvements.

See also 
 GNOME
 Comparison of X Window System desktop environments

Gallery

References

External links 

 
 Plasma Mobile website
 Plasma user wiki
 Plasma developer wiki

Free desktop environments
KDE Plasma
Software that uses QML
Unix windowing system-related software
Widget engines